The Yogasopana Purvacatuska (Marathi: योगसोपान पूर्वचतुष्क (in Devanagari script)) or Stairway to Yoga is a 1905 book in Marathi on hatha yoga by Yogi Narayana Ghamande. It describes and illustrates 37 asanas including Matsyendrasana and Sarvangasana, along with mudras such as Viparita Karani. It was the first and probably the only textbook on yoga to be illustrated with halftone plates. It was influential as the first illustrated yoga textbook to be printed. The book was transitional in several ways: from traditional secrecy to public access to hatha yoga's practices; from symbolic to naturalistic representation of the yoga body, its halftone engravings forming a halfway house between painting and photography; and from spiritual description to art.

A transitional book

The yoga scholar Mark Singleton observes that the publication of Yogasopana was in several ways a "key transitional moment" from medieval hatha yoga to modern yoga as exercise. For the first time, the yogic body was represented naturalistically, using modern half-tone engravings, as a muscled, three-dimensional body in physical postures. This was a radical break from centuries of hatha yoga tradition, in which the body was painted symbolically, to show invisible features such as the subtle body with its chakras, inside a drawn outline of the body, filled in purely by colouring or decoration with no attempt to show the body as a solid object. Influenced by photography, which soon followed in a series of yoga manuals by other authors, the images in Yogasopana, engraved by the experienced artisan Purusottam Sadashiv Joshi, accurately represent the gradations of light and shade on Ghamande's body as he executes the asanas.

In the museum curator Debra Diamond's view, the book "was conceived as a work of art", not just as a practically useful guide to the illustrated asanas, and it was "self-consciously modern". Ghamande was, Singleton observes, consciously acknowledging and breaking the hatha yoga rule of secrecy, with the "somewhat sophistic" justification that "nobody says from whom you have to keep it secret, nor how much you have to hide". The yoga teacher Laura Denham-Jones calls the book one of the early yoga asana self-help manuals; she notes that Ghamande "even provided his address so that students could write to him with any questions."

References

Sources

 
 
 

1905 non-fiction books
Hatha yoga texts